Monk Boudreaux (born Joseph Pierre Boudreaux; 1941 in New Orleans, Louisiana, United States) is an African-American musician and Big Chief of the Golden Eagles, a Mardi Gras Indian tribe. He is widely known for his long-time collaboration with Big Chief Bo Dollis in The Wild Magnolias.

History
In the late 1960s, Boudreaux joined the Wild Magnolias, the Mardi Gras Indian group led by his Big Chief Bo Dollis. Dollis and Boudreaux have been close friends since their childhood.

In 1970, Boudreaux appeared with the Wild Magnolias at the very first New Orleans Jazz & Heritage Festival, and also in the same year, the group released the single "Handa Wanda" on Crescent City Records, the first studio recorded music by the Mardi Gras Indians. In 1974, he appeared with the Wild Magnolias on their debut album on Barclay/Polydor Records which featured Snooks Eaglin and Willie Tee in the supporting musicians. Boudreaux is exclusively featured on Golden Eagles' album Lightning and Thunder, a live recording released in  1988 on Rounder Records.

After being with the Wild Magnolias for over 30 years, Boudreaux left the group in 2001 as a result of disputes with the group's manager over guarantee payments. Since then he has performed and recorded with artists such as Anders Osborne, Galactic and Papa Mali aside from the Golden Eagles.

Boudreaux with the Golden Eagles appears in performance footage in the 2005 documentary film Make It Funky!, which presents a history of New Orleans music and its influence on rhythm and blues, rock and roll, funk and jazz. They perform the Mardi Gras Indian standard "Sew, Sew, Sew".

In the recent years, he has also participated in the recording and tour of the Voice of the Wetlands All-stars, a band that also featured Tab Benoit, Cyril Neville, and Dr. John among others. He is also featured on one track in the New Orleans Social Club's album Sing Me Back Home released in 2006. He currently performs regularly in New Orleans with John Lisi & Delta Funk, with whom he has also recorded.

In 2010, Boudreaux appeared in the feature-length documentary Bury the Hatchet directed by Aaron Walker.  The film is an intimate look at the Mardi Gras Indian tradition, following Boudreaux and several other Mardi Gras Indian Chiefs in the year before Hurricane Katrina, through the storm and the years after.  The documentary won best Louisiana feature at the New Orleans Film festival and a work-in-progress edit of the film won the Grand Prize and Intangible Culture Award at the Royal Anthropological Institute Festival of Ethnographic Film in Leeds, England.

He was a recipient of a 2016 National Heritage Fellowship awarded by the National Endowment for the Arts, which is the United States government's highest honor in the folk and traditional arts.

Discography

Solo
1988 The Golden Eagles/Lightning & Thunder (Rounder)
2002 Bury the Hatchet (Shanachie) with Anders Osborne
2003 Mr. Stranger Man (Shanachie)
2009 Rising Sun (featuring Reverend Goat Carson) (f. Boo Music) 
2011 Won't Bow Down (f. Boo Music)
2021 Bloodstains & Teardrops (Whiskey Bayou Records)

With the Wild Magnolias
1974 The Wild Magnolias (Barclay)
1975 They Call Us Wild (Barclay)
1990 I'm Back… at Carnival Time (Rounder)
1996 1313 Hoodoo Street (AIM)
1999 Life Is a Carnival (Metro Blue)
2002 30 Years .. And Still WILD! (spacing, punctuation, type case sic) (AIM)

Other
1992 The Mardi Gras Indians Super Sunday Showdown (Rounder)
2005 Voice of the Wetlands (Rykodisc)
2005 "Golden Crown" (vocals and wrote song) appeared on Tab Benoit's album Fever On The Bayou (Telarc)
2006 The New Orleans Social Club/Sing Me Back Home (Burgundy)
2007 Goin' Home: A Tribute to Fats Domino (Vanguard)
2012 Rough Guide to the Music of New Orleans (World Music Network)

References

External links
 
 
 Home Of The Groove: Mardi Gras Indians
 Voice of the Wetlands official website
 Uptown Super Sunday 2008

Rhythm and blues musicians from New Orleans
1941 births
American male singers
Living people
Singers from Louisiana
National Heritage Fellowship winners
Rounder Records artists
Shanachie Records artists